Tapay can refer to:

Tapai (also spelled tapay or tape), traditional fermented rice or rice wine in Austronesian cultures
Tapuy, a fermented rice wine from the Luzon highlands in the Philippines
Tapay District, a district in the province of Caylloma, Peru